Henry Simon (born February 12, 1921) is a retired United States Air Force major general who served as deputy director of the Defense Supply Agency. Born in West Virginia, Simon graduated from Cranford High School in Cranford, New Jersey, earned a bachelor's degree in 1948 from Rutgers University and earned two graduate degrees from George Washington University. Simon retired in 1976 and lives in Crystal River, Florida.

References

1921 births
Living people
Cranford High School alumni
George Washington University alumni
People from Cranford, New Jersey
People from Crystal River, Florida
People from Taylor County, West Virginia
Rutgers University alumni
United States Air Force generals